Phidippus asotus is a species of jumping spiders in the family Salticidae. It is found in the United States and Mexico.

References

Salticidae
Spiders described in 1933